Myzocallis is a genus of true bugs belonging to the family Aphididae.

Some species feed on oaks, others on Apocynaceae.

Some species
There are more than 40 species
 Myzocallis asclepiadis
 Myzocallis castanicola
 Myzocallis myricae

References

Aphididae